The men's freestyle light heavyweight competition at the 1948 Summer Olympics in London took place from 29 July to 31 July at the Empress Hall, Earls Court Exhibition Centre. Nations were limited to one competitor.

This freestyle wrestling competition continued to use the "bad points" elimination system introduced at the 1928 Summer Olympics for Greco-Roman and at the 1932 Summer Olympics for freestyle wrestling, with the slight modification introduced in 1936. Each round featured all wrestlers pairing off and wrestling one bout (with one wrestler having a bye if there were an odd number). The loser received 3 points if the loss was by fall or unanimous decision and 2 points if the decision was 2-1 (this was the modification from prior years, where all losses were 3 points). The winner received 1 point if the win was by decision and 0 points if the win was by fall. At the end of each round, any wrestler with at least 5 points was eliminated.

Results

Round 1

 Bouts

 Points

Round 2

 Bouts

 Points

Round 3

 Bouts

 Points

Round 4

 Bouts

 Points

Round 5

 Bouts

 Points

Round 6

None of the three remaining wrestlers had faced each other. Wittenberg-Fahlkvist was the first match among them (round 6). A split decision resulted in neither wrestler receiving enough points to be eliminated.

 Bouts

 Points

Round 7

Stöckli-Fahlkvist was the second match among the medalists (round 7). The result was again a split decision, but this time Fahlkvist had enough points to be eliminated. Stöckli and Wittenberg were left, each with two points, not having faced each other.

 Bouts

 Points

Round 8

With only two wrestlers left, tied on points, round 8 was a de facto gold medal match. Wittenberg won in a split decision. (While neither wrestler had enough points for elimination, there were of course no possible bouts left.)

 Bouts

 Points

References

Wrestling at the 1948 Summer Olympics